Eudonia duospinata is a moth in the family Crambidae. It was described by Wei-Chun Li, Hou-Hun Li and Matthias Nuss in 2012. It is found in China (Fujian, Guizhou) and Taiwan.

The length of the forewings is 5–6 mm. The forewings are covered with blackish-brown scales. The antemedian, postmedian and subterminal lines are white. The hindwings are white.

Etymology
The species name refers to the uncus with posterolateral spine at each side in the male genitalia and is derived from Latin duo (meaning two) and spinatus (meaning spinose).

References

Moths described in 2012
Eudonia